Kazimierz Marcinkiewicz (born 20 December 1959) is a Polish conservative politician who served as Prime Minister of Poland from 31 October 2005 to 14 July 2006. He was a member of the Law and Justice party (Prawo i Sprawiedliwość, PiS).

Early life 
Born in Gorzów Wielkopolski, Marcinkiewicz graduated in 1984 from the Faculty of Mathematics, Physics and Chemistry (having studied physics) of the Wrocław University. He  also completed post-graduate course in Administration at the Adam Mickiewicz University in Poznań. He worked as an elementary school teacher and a headmaster in his homecity of Gorzów Wielkopolski.

In the 1980s he was also a member of the Solidarity movement and editor of underground press materials. In 1992 he became a State Secretary (formal name for deputy minister) in the Ministry of National Education. From 1999 to 2000 he was the cabinet chief for Prime Minister Jerzy Buzek.

Prime Minister of Poland 
Following the victory of the Law and Justice party in the September 2005 Polish parliamentary elections, its prime ministerial candidate, party leader Jarosław Kaczyński decided against becoming prime minister so as not to damage the chances of his twin brother, Lech Kaczyński in the then-upcoming October presidential election. Instead the little-known Marcinkiewicz became PM, leading a coalition formed by Jarosław, who remained in the background, but influential.

Before his prime ministerial appointment, Marcinkiewicz remained a political cipher, which resulted in a political carte blanche after the appointment. Relatively unknown to the public at that time, due to his intensive political activity Marcinkiewicz gained a high public recognition, rapidly becoming the most trusted and popular politician in Poland.

Marcinkiewicz strongly supports Polish membership in EU, although he disagrees with several more integrationist ideas, such as the European Constitution. Economic policy of his cabinet is a continuation of those conducted by previous governments.

Following speculations of a rift with Jarosław Kaczyński, Marcinkiewicz tendered his resignation on 7 July 2006, maintaining however that no one will insert a wedge between him and Kaczyński, words he directed at Donald Tusk. He was succeeded as prime minister on 14 July by Kaczyński.

Later life 
On 18 July Marcinkiewicz was appointed as the temporary acting mayor of Warsaw, a so-called "comissar".
During the municipal elections in 2006, he was the Law and Justice candidate for mayor of Warsaw. In the first round of voting, held on 12 November, he got 38.42%, while his closest rival, Hanna Gronkiewicz-Waltz of the opposition Civic Platform won 34.15% of the votes. In the second round, held on 26 November, he got 46.82% of the votes, losing the election.

He was one of the directors of the European Bank for Reconstruction and Development from March 2007 until May 2008.

From 2008 until 2013 he worked for Goldman Sachs, presumably as a lobbyist. Despite his work for Goldman Sachs, major Polish newspapers and news television channels, informed that former Polish prime minister barely spoke English after one year spent in London. He could not answer simple questions asked by Warsaw based English native speakers hired by one of the Polish tabloid who called him to offer a job in other bank in UK.

In 2009, after divorcing his wife and mother of four, he married his former mistress, 22 years his junior, with whom he was embroiled in a bitter divorce battle in September 2015.

Criticism 
In the first half of 2009, he came under heavy criticism because of not keeping up with the moral values he promoted while being engaged in politics. In particular, it was discovered that he was criticizing extra-marital affairs and praising traditional family values, while having an affair himself.

Famous quotes 
He became famous for his enthusiastic "Yes, yes, yes!" after the success in negotiations of the EU budget on 17 December 2005, – the phrase that has entered into the Polish popular culture as a symbol of a political success 'with a human face' (not refraining from real emotions), but at the same time as a symbol of untempered self-confidence. As a rhetorical device (epizeuxis), it has already been re-used by Volkswagen in its publicity campaign.

References

External links

 Kazimierz Marcinkiewicz's homepage
 Kazimierz Marcinkiewicz's blog
 100 Days of Kazimierz Marcinkiewicz: Euro-Pragmatism Victory
 Jarosław Kaczyński Becomes Poland's Prime Minister

|-

1959 births
Living people
People from Gorzów Wielkopolski
Law and Justice politicians
Prime Ministers of Poland
University of Wrocław alumni
Polish Roman Catholics
Members of the Polish Sejm 1997–2001
Members of the Polish Sejm 2001–2005
Members of the Polish Sejm 2005–2007